The Chico Force were a franchise in the International Basketball League based in Chico, California. The team was highly successful in their first season, sporting a 13-7 record, second in the west and 1/2 games behind the Tacoma Thunder. The Force are coached by Ron Dubois, and the team's 2005 leading scorer was Chris Gonzalez, who tied for 22nd in the league with 20.2 ppg.

The Force played their initial season at Pleasant Valley High School.  In 2006, games will be played at Marsh Junior High School.

Season By Season

All-Stars

2005
 Will Bonner
 Chris Gonzalez
 Ed Madec

2006
 Franco Harris
 Jason VanEck

2007
 Tyree Jones

Related Links/Sources
- Force page on IBL website

International Basketball League teams

Sports in Chico, California